Gliese 268 (QY Aurigae) is a RS Canum Venaticorum variable (RS CVn) star in the Auriga constellation. RS CVn variables are binary star systems with a strong magnetic field influenced by each star's rotation, which is accelerated by the tidal effects of the other star in the system. Gliese 268 in particular is composed of a binary system of two M-type dwarfs, or red dwarfs, and is one of the one hundred closest star systems to the Earth. The primary component of the system has an apparent magnitude of 12.05, and the secondary component an apparent magnitude of 12.45. Neither is visible to the naked eye from Earth.

References

Auriga (constellation)
RS Canum Venaticorum variables
0268
Aurigae, QY
034603
M-type main-sequence stars
TIC objects